Nosratabad (also Romanized as Noşratābād) is a village in Dashtabi-ye Gharbi Rural District, Dashtabi District, Buin Zahra County, Qazvin Province, Iran. At the 2006 census, its population was 63, in 15 families.

References 

Populated places in Buin Zahra County